David Pardo was an 18th-century Italian rabbi and liturgical poet who lived for some time in Sarajevo, Bosnia and in Jerusalem. Among other things, he authored a commentary on the Sifra on Leviticus and Maskil le-David (Venice, 1760), a super-commentary on Rashi on the Torah.

Pardo was born in Venice on 29 March 1719 and died in Jerusalem in 1792. He was the son of Jacob Pardo of Ragusa, rabbi of Venice. After finishing his studies, Pardo left Venice and went to Ragusa. He then lived for some years in Sarajevo, where he devoted himself to teaching. From Sarajevo he went to Spalato, Dalmatia, where Rabbi Abraham David Papo engaged him as teacher at the yeshivah. After the death of Papo's successor, Isaac Tzedakah, Pardo was elected chief rabbi of the city. Among his disciples were Shabbethai Ventura, David Pinto, and Abraham Curiel. In 1752 Pardo began to publish, his first work being Shoshannim le-David (Venice, 1752), a commentary on the Mishnah.

In 1764 Pardo accepted the position of chief rabbi at Sarajevo, where he succeeded Joshua Isaac Machoro. He employed his leisure time in writing and publishing various works. Toward the end of his life he went to Jerusalem, where he died.

Besides the above-mentioned works, Pardo wrote the following works: Miktam le-David (Salonica, 1769), responsa; Chasde David (part i., Leghorn, 1776; part ii., ib. 1790), commentary on the Tosefta; Chukkat ha-Pesach (Leghorn, 1796), a ritual for the Passover season; and La-Menatzeach le-David (Salonica, 1795), novellae on various Talmudic topics. Among his liturgical works are the following: Sekiyyot ha-Chemdah (Salonica, 1756; often reprinted), ritual for the first day of Nisan; Shirah Chadashah (Amsterdam, 1776 [?]), the history of Esther in verse; Mizmor le-David (Leghorn, 1818), notes on Shulchan 'Aruk, Yoreh De'ah; Shif'at Rebibim (Leghorn, 1788, and often reprinted), prayers for holy days, with a poetical presentation of the Temple service on the Day of Atonement and other piyyutim, published by his disciple Elisha Chabillo, called also "Mercado." Notes of Pardo's on the Talmud are found in the Vienna edition of 1860-72, and on Alfasi in the Wilna edition of 1881-86. The library of the Jewish community at Rustchuk owns a Miktam le-David bearing the author's signature.

Pardo married a young woman of Spalato, who aided him in literary labors. She bore him three sons, named Jacob, Isaac, and Abraham, and one daughter. The last-named married Abraham Penso, author of the Appe Zutre (Salonica, 1798). Abraham Pardo married a daughter of the bibliographer Rabbi Hayyim Joseph David Azulai. Isaac succeeded him as rabbi of Sarajevo.

References

1719 births
1792 deaths
Chief rabbis of cities
18th-century Republic of Venice rabbis
Jewish poets
Italian Sephardi Jews
18th-century rabbis from the Ottoman Empire
Rabbis from Sarajevo